This list of compositions by the English composer Jane Joseph (1894–1929) may be incomplete. Many of her works, particularly those written for performance at amateur musical events, were unpublished; some have been lost, while in some cases manuscripts are held in private or institutional hands. The list is divided between (1) published works, or works where there is a record of performance and (2) other unpublished works.

Compositions

Table 1: Works published and/or with evidence of performance
The following works have either been published or there is reasonable evidence of their performance. Details of composition dates and dates of publication are incomplete; information can be added or amended as necessary.

Table 2: Unpublished works, no performance details
This listing is based on Gustav Holst's tribute essay in The Monthly Musical Record, 1 April 1931, which included a list of Joseph's unpublished works.
 
Choral and vocal
Five songs with strings accompaniment: "Two Doves"; "Oh, Roses";  "Sleep, cast thy canopy"; "I'll give my love an apple" (with oboe); "The seeds of love"
Choruses with orchestra
Christmas Cantata
A Wedding Antiphon
Kyrie
Christmas Song
"The Night"
"The Morning Watch"

Instrumental
Miniature Quartet (oboe, violin, viola and violoncello)
Variations on an American Air (horn and piano)
Duet (violin and cello)
Allegretto (two flutes, two oboes, one clarinet, one bassoon)
Two Short Trios (violin, cello and piano)

Orchestral
Full orchestra
Passepied 
"I will give my love an apple" 
Andante
Symphonic Dance 
Ballet music: "The Enamoured Shepherd"
String orchestra
Sonatina for School Bands 
Rabbit Dance 
Country Dance

Incidental Music to Plays.
Amy Clarke's Play
Famine Song
Awake the Shade
Spirit Music
The Moon's Eclipse
Procession and Ballet

Also: Nine piano pieces; 4 unaccompanied songs; 29 songs with piano; 2 two-part songs with piano; 26 choral pieces, unaccompanied; 10 orchestral arrangements (including folk-dances); 28 unison songs (arranged with orchestra); 5 choral pieces (arrangements, unaccompanied); 5 rounds.

References
Notes

Book

Joseph, Jane